Botruanthus is a genus of cnidarians belonging to the family Botrucnidiferidae.

The species of this genus are found in Northern America.

Species:

Botruanthus benedeni 
Botruanthus mexicanus

References

Botrucnidiferidae
Anthozoa genera